Secret Story is the original French version of the reality show Secret Story. The show inherits more or less the fundamental principles of Big Brother, a reality show created by producer John de Mol in 1997. It's the second French adaptation of Big Brother, after two seasons of Loft Story, the first French adaptation of Big Brother, hosted by Benjamin Castaldi in 2001 and 2002 on M6.

The show hosted by Benjamin Castaldi (season 1 to 8) and Christophe Beaugrand (season 9 to 11). It has been broadcast on the channel TF1 from 23 June 2007 to 26 September 2014 (season 1 to 8). During season 9, the eviction episodes were broadcast on TF1 and the highlight episodes were broadcast on NT1. Since the season 10, Secret Story is broadcast on NT1 expect for the premiere which is broadcast on TF1.

The housemates are cut off from the rest of the world for ten to fifteen weeks in a house called "house of secrets", where every room is fitted with video cameras, except the restroom. They have to keep a secret while trying to discover the other housemates' one.

Series overall

The house of secrets 
At the beginning of each season, the "house of secrets" also contains hidden rooms. It contains for example a "Chamber of truths" in the first season (room accessible by pressing a button hidden in the tapestry), a "Cave of love" in the second season (room accessible by a passage in the pool), or "a house of intruders" in the third season (room accessible by a secret passage on the floor). Some "Secret rooms" are also set up for each season where two contestants announced as eliminated to the other candidates have to remain locked up in order to see all their comings and goings through television screens.

Other rooms are features of Big Brother, as the "confessional" where each contestant goes every day to give his impression or opinion on events that happen in the house to "The Voice", or a double-door entrance, an intermediary passage between the house and outside, where "nominated" (contestants who have been chosen to leave the house by the others) learn their elimination or reintegration in the house where some contestants can come into contact with other candidates who have already been eliminated through a glass pane.

The Voice 

An invisible male character named "The Voice" (La Voix) can speak at any time to the contestants through the speakers and give them instructions. This is the voice of the radio host Dominique Duforest. "The Voice" always starts its interventions with the sentence "This is the Voice" and ends with "That is all … for now".

At the beginning of the game, "The Voice" imposes some rules that the contestants have to obey during the whole game if they don't want to be penalized (no more warm water, withdrawal of a contestant's kitty bank for example).
During the game, a "red phone" makes its appearance from which "The Voice" can get the contestants that answer win or lose money, give a resident one more vote against him for nominations, or allow a contestant to "nominate automatically" another one.

"The Voice" also has the ability to propose an emotional or entertaining "secret mission" to one or several contestants of its choice, allowing him or them to win money without the knowledge of other contestants. Activities and parties are also organized by "The Voice" in order to break contestants' every day life, but also to replenish their kitty bank.

Secret 

The characteristic of Secret Story is the fact that each contestant must hide a secret that relates to them to protect their kitty bank initially filled up with 10 000 euros. The secrets of the contestants are usually personal as "I decided to change sex", "I survived a tsunami" or "I have Einstein's IQ", but they can also be changed or imposed by the production as "We are a false couple" or "We are the intruders of the house".

The contestant who thinks he guessed the secret of another one can "buzz" the latter, that is to say setting off a kind of sound alarm located in the confessional. Then there is a "confrontation" between the two contestants in private and in the presence of "the Voice" where the defendant has to justify himself without revealing his secret. The discoverer can confirm its "buzz" by investing a part of its kitty bank (the sum set by "the Voice" is 5000 euros). In this case, the answer is given later in front of the other contestants. If he guessed right, he wins the whole defendant's kitty bank; otherwise, he lets him having the total of the "buzz" (excepted in case of free "buzz" offered previously by "the Voice" or by the public and/or the Internet users who vote for the election of the best investigator of the week).

References

External links
 Official site 
 Secret Story on imdb

 
French reality television series
2007 French television series debuts
TF1 original programming